LAF may refer to:

"L.A.F." (song)
Laf (crater), on Mars
Lafayette, Indiana (Amtrak station), United States; Amtrak station code LAF
Lafayette College, a liberal arts college located in Easton, Pennsylvania
Lance Armstrong Foundation
Lean air-fuel
Lebanese Air Force
Lebanese Armed Forces
Leeds Art Fund
Lithuanian Activist Front
Liquidity adjustment facility
Purdue University Airport, Indiana, United States, by IATA airport code
Latvian Air Force, by ICAO code
Luftseilbahn Adliswil-Felsenegg, a cable car in Adliswil, Switzerland
Look and feel, a computer related term
League of American Football in Russia